Poradów may refer to the following places in Poland:
Poradów, Lower Silesian Voivodeship (south-west Poland)
Poradów, Lesser Poland Voivodeship (south Poland)